Challenge is a chain of independently owned petrol stations around New Zealand.

The chain is made up of 78 petrol stations, including five in Auckland. Most of the petrol stations are based in small towns and stock petrol and diesel; many have amenities and small convenience stores.

History

The first Challenge petrol station was opened by Fletcher Challenge in April 1998. The lower prices of Challenge and Gull New Zealand contributed to a price war in the New Zealand fuel retailing industry.

Challenge was purchased by Caltex New Zealand from Rubicon in 2001. It became part of the Rubicon business during the split of Fletcher Challenge in 2001, and was sold to Caltex New Zealand later that year. 

Z Energy purchased Caltex New Zealand in 2016, bringing the Challenge service stations into Z's network. When the offer to buy was made in 2015, Challenge was owned by the Farmlands Co-operative under license from Chevron New Zealand.

References

Oil and gas companies of New Zealand